Olena Sharha (born 21 December 1986) is a Ukrainian road cyclist, who rides for Ukrainian amateur team . She participated at the 2012 UCI Road World Championships.

Major results
Source: 

2008
 9th Tour of Chongming Island Time Trial
 10th Grand Prix de Dottignies
2009
 3rd Time trial, National Road Championships
2010
 9th GP Liberazione
2011
 2nd Golan I
 2nd Golan II
2012
 7th Overall Gracia-Orlová
 7th Grand Prix GSB
 8th Grand Prix el Salvador
2013
 3rd Time trial, National Road Championships
2014
 7th Overall Tour of Zhoushan Island
2015
 3rd Time trial, National Road Championships
2016
 5th VR Women ITT
 6th Horizon Park Women Challenge
2018
 2nd Time trial, National Road Championships
2019
 1st Grand Prix Velo Alanya
 2nd Chabany Race
 3rd Road race, National Road Championships
 3rd VR Women ITT
2020
 3rd Road race, National Road Championships
 9th Grand Prix Alanya
 9th Grand Prix Gazipaşa
2021
 3rd Road race, National Road Championships
 3rd Grand Prix Velo Erciyes

References

External links
 
 

1986 births
Ukrainian female cyclists
Living people
Place of birth missing (living people)